The 2005 Dhaka garment factory collapse or Spectrum garment factory collapse was a structural failure that occurred on Monday, 11 April 2005 in the Savar Upazila of Dhaka, Bangladesh where a nine-story commercial building collapsed. The site is located about 30 km northwest of Dhaka. The explosion of a boiler on the ground floor triggered the collapse. The owner of the building was Shahriar Sayeed Husain, a Bangladeshi businessman.

See also

 2012 Dhaka garment factory fire
 Pakistan garment factory fires (2012)
 2013 Savar building collapse – another garment factory collapse in Dhaka
 Thane building collapse (2013)
 Accord on Factory and Building Safety in Bangladesh
 Alliance for Bangladesh Worker Safety

References

Further reading
 Spectrum collapse related news on Clean Cloths Campaign.

External links
 Interviews with workers, survivors on 1 June 2005

2005 disasters in Bangladesh
Dhaka
Dhaka
Collapsed buildings
Buildings and structures in Dhaka
Dhaka
Man-made disasters in Bangladesh
2000s in Dhaka

Economic history of Bangladesh